William M. Hempel (February 10, 1920 – January 19, 2001) was a player in the National Football League. He played for the Chicago Bears.

References

1920 births
2001 deaths
American football tackles
Carroll Pioneers football players
Chicago Bears players
Players of American football from Nebraska
Sportspeople from Lincoln, Nebraska